Sangeet Raj Lodha (born 13 October 1959) is an Indian judge. He was the senior-most judge of the Rajasthan High Court after the Chief Justice of Rajasthan High Court, till his retirement on 13 October 2021. Prior to elevation, he was a practicing lawyer in the Rajasthan High Court. His areas of specialization are - Constitutional, Civil and Tax matters. He was elevated to the post of Judge of Rajasthan High Court on 5 July 2007. Recently, a break-through judgement by Justice Lodha and Justice Rameshwar Vyas's Division Bench declared the levy of advance fees by medical colleges as illegal. In 2019, he refused to hear Asaram's plea for parole to meet his sick wife.

References 

Indian judges
Living people
1959 births
Judges of the Rajasthan High Court